Acosmeryx formosana is a moth of the family Sphingidae. It was described by Shōnen Matsumura in 1927. It is endemic to Taiwan.

The wingspan is 67–73 mm.

References

Acosmeryx
Moths described in 1927
Moths of Taiwan
Taxa named by Shōnen Matsumura